Camilla von Hollay (born Kamilla Borbála Hollay; 11 July 1899 – 9 February 1967) was a Hungarian film actress of the silent era. She appeared in more than 40 films between 1917 and 1930. She was born in Budapest, Austria-Hungary and died in Budapest.

Selected filmography

 A Régiséggyüjtö (1917)
 Casanova (1918)
 Az Élet királya (1917)
 The Fire Ship (1922)
 The Stolen Professor (1924)
 Passion (1925)
 Madame Wants No Children (1926)
 Superfluous People (1926)
 The Eleven Schill Officers (1926)
 A Sister of Six (1926)
 The Queen of the Baths (1926)
 At the Edge of the World (1927)
 The Weavers (1927)
 The Salvation Army Girl (1927)
 Break-in (1927)
 Potsdam (1927)
 The Duty to Remain Silent (1928)
 The Green Alley (1928)
  When the Mother and the Daughter (1928)
 Immorality (1928)
 The Saint and Her Fool (1928)
 The Abduction of the Sabine Women (1928)
 The Beaver Coat (1928)
 Waterloo (1929)
 The Great Longing (1930)
 Retreat on the Rhine (1930)
 Love and Champagne (1930)
 The Tender Relatives (1930)

External links

1899 births
1967 deaths
Hungarian film actresses
Hungarian silent film actresses
20th-century Hungarian actresses